Peggy Phelan (born April 23, 1959) is an American feminist scholar. She is one of the founders of Performance Studies International, the former chair of New York University's Department of Performance Studies from 1993 to 1996, Stanford's Theatre and Performance Studies Department (then called the Drama Department) from 2007 to 2011, and continues as the Ann O’Day Maples Professor of the Arts, Professor of Theater & Performance Studies and English, and the Denning Family Director of the Stanford Arts Institute.

Phelan's work is primarily concerned with the investigation of performance as a live event. She argued that the ephemerality of performance is crucial to its force. While most of her initial work was rooted in feminist post-structuralism and psychoanalysis, her more recent work is concerned with media, photography, and visual arts. She has written on the selfie, and on Reagan and Warhol.  Her most widely recognized essay is "The Ontology of Performance," originally published in Unmarked: the politics of performance (1993).

Select Publications 
 Phelan, Peggy. Live Art in La: Performance in Southern California, 1970-1983. New York: Routledge, 2012.
 Reckitt, Helena, and Peggy Phelan. Art and Feminism. London: Phaidon, 2001.
 Phelan, Peggy, Hans U. Obrist, Elisabeth Bronfen, and Pipilotti Rist. Pipilotti Rist. London: Phaidon, 2001.
 Phelan, Peggy, and Martin Gustavsson. Martin Gustavsson. Stockholm, 2001.
 Phelan, Peggy. Special Issue: Narrative and Performance. Columbus, OH: Ohio State University Press, 2000.
 Phelan, Peggy, and Jill Lane. The Ends of Performance. New York: New York University Press, 1998.
 Phelan, Peggy. Mourning Sex: Performing Public Memories. London: Routledge, 1997. 
 Phelan, Peggy. Unmarked: The Politics of Performance. London: Routledge, 1993.

Awards 
 2004 Guggenheim Fellowship for Theatre Arts
 Getty Research Fellow 2004-2005
 Stanford Humanities Center, Fellow, 2011–12
 Australian National University Fellow

References

External links
Profile page: Peggy Phelan Stanford University
WorldCat
Profile page: Peggy Phelan Stanford University

	

1948 births
Living people
Feminist studies scholars
Stanford University Department of Drama faculty
Stanford University Department of English faculty